The ranks of imperial consorts have varied over the course of Chinese history but remained important throughout owing to its importance in management of the inner court and in imperial succession, which ranked heirs according to the prominence of their mothers in addition to their strict birth order. Regardless of the age, however, it is common in English translation to simplify these hierarchy into the three ranks of Empress, consorts, and concubines. It is also common to use the term "harem", an Arabic loan word used in recent times to refer to imperial women's forbidden quarters in many countries. In later Chinese dynasties, these quarters were known as the back palace (後宮; hòugōng). In Chinese, the system is called the Rear Palace System (後宮制度; hòugōng zhìdù).

Early history
There exists a class of consorts called Ying (媵; yìng) during early historical times in China. These were people who came along with brides as a form of dowry. It could be the female cousin or sister of the bride, or people from other countries (not necessarily from another race).

Worth noting is the fact that during the Shang Dynasty, there were times where two Empresses reigned at the same period.

The Rites of Zhou contains great details of an imperial consort ranking system. However, as the Rites of Zhou is considered by modern scholars to be merely a fictitious constitution for a utopian society, the system listed in that work of literature cannot be taken word for word. Rather, it offers a rough glimpse into the inner harem during the time.

Ranking system for Emperors
The Rites of Zhou states that for Kings, they are entitled to the following:

 1 Queen (王后; wáng hòu)
 2 Consorts (妃; "fei")
 3 Wives (夫人; fū rén)
 9 Royal Concubines (嬪; pín)
 27 Hereditary Consorts (世婦; shì fù)
 81 Royal Wives (御妻; yù qī)

It was suggested that a system (not necessarily resembling the one listed above) was set up to prevent the situation of having two Queens/Empresses.

Ranking system for others
According to the Rites of Zhou, Feudal Lords are entitled to 9 consorts in total, and cannot marry again after having 9 consorts, which makes for 1 wife and 8 consorts. For other officers, they are entitled to 1 wife and 1 consort. For normal citizens, only 1 wife is allowed.

Qin
From the reign of King Huiwen:
 Queen (王后; wáng hòu), which became Empress (皇后; huáng hòu) from the reign of Qin Shi Huang
 Madame (夫人; fū rén)
 Beauty (美人; měi rén)
 Virtuous Lady (良人; liáng rén)
 Consort (八子; bā zi)
 Lady (七子; qī zi)
 Senior Palace Woman (長使; zhǎng shǐ)
 Junior Palace Woman (少使; shǎo shǐ)

Han

Western Han
During the reign of Gaozu:
 Empress (皇后; huáng hòu)
 Madame (夫人; fū rén)

Later:
 Empress (皇后; huáng hòu)
 Madame (夫人; fū rén)
 Beauty (美人; měi rén)
 Virtuous Lady (良人; liáng rén)
 Consort (八子; bā zi)
 Lady (七子; qī zi)
 Senior Palace Woman (長使; zhǎng shǐ)
 Junior Palace Woman (少使; shǎo shǐ)

From the reign of Emperor Yuan:
 Empress (皇后; huáng hòu)
 Lady of Bright Deportment (昭儀; zhāo yí)
 Lady of Handsome Fairness (婕妤; jié yú), created by Emperor Wu
 Lady of Graceful Beauty (娙娥; xíng é), created by Emperor Wu
 Lady of Lovely Countenance (容華; róng huá), created by Emperor Wu
 Lady of Complete Deportment (充衣; chōng yī), created by Emperor Wu
 Beauty (美人; měi rén)
 Virtuous Lady (良人; liáng rén)
 Consort (八子; bā zi)
 Lady (七子; qī zi)
 Senior Palace Woman (長使; zhǎng shǐ)
 Junior Palace Woman (少使; shǎo shǐ)
 Lady for Miscellaneous Uses (五官; wǔ guān)
 Lady of Complaisant Constancy (順常; shùn cháng)
 Lady Without Impurity (舞涓; wǔ juān), Lady of Reverent Gentleness (共和; gòng hé), Lady who Pleases the Spirit (娛靈; yú líng), Lady who Could Comfort a Multitude (保林; bǎo lín), Lady of Excellent Employment (良使; liáng shǐ), Lady for Night Attendance (夜者; yè zhě)

The principal wife of the Crown Prince was called (妃; fēi). For grandchildren of the Emperor, their principal wives were called Madame (夫人; fū rén). Concubines for these people have no titles, and were simple called (家人子;  jiā rén zǐ).

Eastern Han
 Empress (皇后; huáng hòu)
 Noble Lady (貴人; guì rén)
 Beauty (美人; měi rén)
 Courtier (宮人; gōng rén)
 Talented Lady (才女; cǎi nǚ)

No limits were set for these consorts. This later created situations when more than 20,000 women were living in the palace during the reigns of Emperor Huan and Emperor Ling.

Three Kingdoms

Cao Wei
During the reign of Cao Cao (who was not an emperor but a king):
 Queen (王后; wáng hòu)
 Madame (夫人; fū rén)
 Lady of Bright Deportment (昭儀; zhāo yí)
 Lady of Handsome Fairness (婕妤; jié yú)
 Lady of Lovely Countenance (容華; róng huá)
 Beauty (美人; měi rén)

During the reign of Emperor Wen:
 Empress (皇后; huáng hòu)
 Madame (夫人; fū rén)
 Noble Imperial Concubines (貴嬪; guì pín)
 Lady of Pure Beauty (淑媛; shū yuàn)
 Lady of Bright Deportment (昭儀; zhāo yí)
 Lady of Cultivated Countenance (修容; xiū róng)
 Lady of Handsome Fairness (婕妤; jié yú)
 Lady of Lovely Countenance (容華; róng huá)
 Lady of Humble Capability (順成; shùn chéng)
 Beauty (美人; měi rén)
 Virtuous Lady (良人; liáng rén)

During the reign of Emperor Ming:
 Empress (皇后; huáng hòu)
 Madame (夫人; fū rén)
 Noble Imperial Concubines (貴嬪; guì pín)
 Pure Consort (淑妃; shū fēi)
 Lady of Pure Beauty (淑媛; shū yuàn)
 Lady of Bright Deportment (昭儀; zhāo yí)
 Lady of Bright Magnificence (昭華; zhāo huá)
 Lady of Cultivated Countenance (修容; xiū róng)
 Lady of Cultivated Deportment (修儀; xiū yí)
 Lady of Handsome Fairness (婕妤; jié yú)
 Lady of Lovely Countenance (傛華; rǒng huá)
 Beauty (美人; měi rén)
 Virtuous Lady (良人; liáng rén)
 Desirable Lady (鹺人; cuó rén)

Jin
 1 Empress (皇后; huáng hòu)
 3 Madames (夫人; fū rén)
 Noble Imperial Concubines (貴嬪; guì pín)
 Madame (夫人; fū rén)
 Noble Lady (貴人; guì rén)
 9 Imperial Concubines (嬪; pín)
 Pure Consort (淑妃; shū fēi)
 Lady of Pure Beauty (淑媛; shū yuàn)
 Lady of Warm Ceremony (淑儀; shū yí)
 Lady of Cultivated Splendidness (修華; xiū huá)
 Lady of Cultivated Countenance (修容; xiū róng)
 Lady of Cultivated Deportment (修儀; xiū yí)
 Lady of Handsome Fairness (婕妤; jié yú)
 Lady of Splendid Countenance (容華; róng huá)
 Lady of Sufficient Countenance (充華; chōng huá)
 Beauty (美人; měi rén)
 Lady of Talents (才人; cái rén)
 Lady of Regular Talents (中才人; zhōng cái rén)

Northern and Southern dynasties

Liu Song
 1 Empress (皇后; huáng hòu)
 3 Madames (夫人; fū rén)
 Noble Imperial Concubines (貴嬪; guì pín)
 Consort (夫人; fū rén)
 Noble Lady (貴人; guì rén)
 9 Imperial Concubines (嬪; pín)
 Pure Consort (淑妃; shū fēi)
 Lady of Pure Beauty (淑媛; shū yuàn)
 Lady of Warm Ceremony (淑儀; shū yí)
 Lady of Cultivated Splendidness (修華; xiū huá)
 Lady of Cultivated Countenance (修容; xiū róng)
 Lady of Cultivated Deportment (修儀; xiū yí)
 Lady of Handsome Fairness (婕妤; jié yú)
 Lady of Everlasting Splendidness (傛華; yǒng huá)
 Lady of Sufficient Splendidness (充華; chōng huá)
 Beauty (美人; měi rén)

From 456, during the reign of Emperor Xiaowu:
 1 Empress (皇后; huáng hòu)
 3 Madames (夫人; fū rén)
 Noble Consort (貴妃; guì fēi)
 Noble Imperial Concubines (貴嬪; guì pín)
 Noble Lady (貴人; guì rén)
 9 Imperial Concubines (嬪; pín)
 Pure Consort (淑妃; shū fēi)
 Lady of Pure Beauty (淑媛; shū yuàn)
 Lady of Warm Ceremony (淑儀; shū yí)
 Lady of Bright Deportment (昭儀; zhāo yí)
 Lady of Bright Countenance (昭容; zhāo róng)
 Lady of Bright Splendidness (昭華; zhāo huá)
 Lady of Handsome Fairness (婕妤; jié yú)
 Lady of Lovely Countenance (容華; róng huá)
 Lady of Sufficient Splendidness (充華; chōng huá)
 Beauty (美人; měi rén)
 Lady of Regular Talents (中才人; zhōng cái rén)
 Lady of Complete Deportment (充衣; chōng yī)

From the reign of Emperor Ming:
 1 Empress (皇后; huáng hòu)
 3 Madames (夫人; fū rén)
 Noble Consort (貴妃; guì fēi)
 Noble Imperial Concubine (貴嬪; guì pín)
 Noble Concubine (貴姬; guì jī)
 9 Imperial Concubines (嬪; pín)
 Lady of Pure Beauty (淑媛; shū yuàn)
 Lady of Pure Deportment (淑儀; shū yí)
 Lady of Pure Countenance (淑容; shū róng)
 Lady of Bright Splendidness (昭華; zhāo huá)
 Lady of Bright Deportment (昭儀; zhāo yí)
 Lady of Bright Countenance (昭容; zhāo róng)
 Lady of Cultivated Splendidness (修華; xiū huá)
 Lady of Cultivated Deportment (修儀; xiū yí)
 Lady of Cultivated Countenance (修容; xiū róng)
 5 (職; zhí)
 Handsome Fairness (婕妤; jié yú)
 Lady of Lovely Countenance (容華; róng huá)
 Lady of Sufficient Countenance (充華; chōng huá)
 Lady of Inherit Honor (承徽; chéng huī)
 Lady of Kind Honor (列榮; liè róng)
 Beauty (美人; měi rén)
 Lady of Regular Talents (中才人; zhōng cái rén)
 Lady of Talents (才人; cái rén)
 Lady of Virtue (良人; liáng rén)
 Lady of Complete Deportment (充衣; chōng yī)

Southern Qi
In 479, at the ascension of Emperor Gao, the Minister for Ceremonies (禮司) successfully petitioned the Emperor to establish the following system:
 1 Empress (皇后; huáng hòu)
 3 Madames (夫人; fū rén)
 Noble Imperial Concubine (貴嬪; guì pín)
 Madame (夫人; fū rén)
 Noble Lady (貴人; guì rén)
 9 Imperial Concubines (嬪; pín)
 Lady of Cultivated Splendidness (修華; xiū huá)
 Lady of Cultivated Deportment (修儀; xiū yí)
 Lady of Cultivated Countenance (修容; xiū róng)
 Pure Consort (淑妃; shū fēi)
 Lady of Pure Beauty (淑媛; shū yuàn)
 Lady of Pure Appearance (淑儀; shū yí)
 Handsome Fairness (婕妤; jié yú)
 Lady of Lovely Countenance (容華; róng huá)
 Lady of Sufficient Splendidness (充華; chōng huá)
 Beauty (美人; měi rén)
 Lady of Regular Talents(中才人; zhōng cái rén)
 Lady of Talents (才人; cái rén)

In 481, for the Crown Prince:
 Lady of Virtue (良娣; liáng dì)
 Lady of Treasure (保林; bǎo lín)
 Lady of Talents (才人; cái rén)

In 483, when Emperor Wu ascended to the throne, the Minister for Ceremonies (禮司) successfully petitioned the Emperor to expand the system. This involved elevating the position of Noble Consort (貴妃; guì fēi) to a category all unto itself, with the following ranks:
 Noble Consort (貴妃; guì fēi)
 Pure Consort (淑妃; shū fēi)
The new category was just underneath the Empress. In 489, the position of Lady of Bright Countenance (昭容; zhāo róng) was created to fill the gap created when Pure Consort (淑妃; shū fēi) was elevated to an independent category.

Liang
During the reign of Emperor Wu:
 1 Empress (皇后; huáng hòu)
 3 Madames (夫人; fū rén)
 Noble Consort (貴妃; guì fēi)
 Noble Imperial Concubine (貴嬪; guì pín)
 Noble Concubine (貴姬; guì jī)
 9 Imperial Concubines (嬪; pín)
 Lady of Pure Beauty (淑媛; shū yuàn)
 Lady of Pure Appearance (淑儀; shū yí)
 Lady of Pure Countenance (淑容; shū róng)
 Lady of Bright Splendidness (昭華; zhāo huá)
 Lady of Bright Countenance (昭容; zhāo róng)
 Lady of Bright Deportment (昭儀; zhāo yí)
 Lady of Cultivated Splendidness (修華; xiū huá)
 Lady of Cultivated Deportment (修儀; xiū yí)
 Lady of Cultivated Countenance (修容; xiū róng)
 5 (職; zhí)
 Lady of Handsome Fairness (婕妤; jié yú)
 Lady of Lovely Countenance (容華; róng huá)
 Lady of Sufficient Splendidness (充華; chōng huá)
 Lady of Inherit Honor (承徽; chéng huī)
 Lady of Kind Honor (列榮; liè róng)
 Beauty (美人; měi rén)
 Lady of Virtue (良人; liáng rén)
 Lady of Talents (才人; cái rén)

For the Crown Prince:
 Lady of Excellence (良娣; liáng dì)
 Lady of Treasure (保林; bǎo lín)

Chen
Initially, during the reign of Gaozu, no specific ranking system for consorts were devised, due to the Emperor's desire to live a simple life. It was only until Emperor Wen's reign did a ranking system came into being:
 1 Empress (皇后; huáng hòu)
 3 Madames (夫人; fū rén)
 Noble Consort (貴妃; guì fēi)
 Noble Imperial Concubine (貴嬪; guì pín)
 Noble Concubine (貴姬; guì jī)
 9 Imperial Concubines (嬪; pín)
 Lady of Pure Beauty (淑媛; shū yuàn)
 Lady of Pure Appearance (淑儀; shū yí)
 Lady of Pure Countenance (淑容; shū róng)
 Lady of Bright Splendidness (昭華; zhāo huá)
 Lady of Bright Countenance (昭容; zhāo róng)
 Lady of Bright Deportment (昭儀; zhāo yí)
 Lady of Cultivated Splendidness (修華; xiū huá)
 Lady of Cultivated Deportment (修儀; xiū yí)
 Lady of Cultivated Countenance (修容; xiū róng)
 5 (職; zhí)
 Handsome Fairness (婕妤; jié yú)
 Lady of Lovely Countenance (容華; róng huá)
 Lady of Sufficient Splendidness (充華; chōng huá)
 Lady of Inherit Honor (承徽; chéng huī)
 Lady of Kind Honor (列榮; liè róng)
 Beauty (美人; měi rén)
 Lady of Talents (才人; cái rén)
 Lady of Virtue (良人; liáng rén)

Northern Wei
During the reign of Emperor Daowu, the consort ranking system was very simple, and only contained the rank of Madame (夫人; fū rén). However, there existed an unwritten, subjective system of prestige rankings in between. It was during the reign of Emperor Taiwu that the system of rankings listed below came into force:
 Empress (皇后; huáng hòu)
 Left Lady of Bright Deportment (左昭儀; zuǒ zhāo yí), Right Lady of Bright Deportment (右昭儀; yòu zhāo yí)
 Noble Lady (貴人; guì rén)
 (椒房; jiāo fáng)
 (中式; zhōng shì)

During the sinification of the Northern Wei Dynasty, Emperor Xiaowen reformed the consort ranking system to the system below:
 1 Empress (皇后; huáng hòu)
 Left Lady of Bright Deportment (左昭儀; zuǒ zhāo yí), Right Lady of Bright Deportment (右昭儀; yòu zhāo yí)
 3 Madames (夫人; fū rén)
 Third Imperial Concubine (三嬪; sān pín)
 Sixth Imperial Concubine (六嬪; (liù pín)
 Hereditary Consort (世婦; shì fù)
 Imperial Wife (御妻; yù qī)

Northern Qi
In the beginning, there were only three ranks for consorts: Madame (夫人; fū rén), Imperial Concubine (嬪; pín), and Imperial Ladies (禦; yù). However, as Emperor Wucheng ascended to the throne, a system of rankings more sophisticated than any devised before was promulgated:
 1 Empress (皇后; huáng hòu)
 1 Left Lady of Beautiful Flower (左娥英; zuǒ é yīng), 1 Right Lady of Beautiful Flower (右娥英; yòu é yīng)
 1 Pure Consort (淑妃; shū fēi)
 1 Left Lady of Bright Deportment (左昭儀; zuǒ zhāo yí), 1 Right Lady of Bright Deportment (右昭儀; yòu zhāo yí)
 3 Madames (夫人; fū rén)
 Madame of Great Moral (弘德; hóng dé)
 Madame of Just Moral (正德; zhèng dé)
 Madame of High Moral (崇德; chóng dé)
 Upper Concubines (上嬪; shàng pín)
 Upper Concubine of Great Honor (隆徽; lóng huī)
 Upper Concubine of Light Plan (光猷; guāng yóu)
 Upper Concubine of Bright Instruction (昭訓; zhāo xùn)
 Lower Concubines (下嬪; xià pín)
 Lower Concubine of Proclaimed Honor (宣徽; xuān huī)
 Lower Concubine of Proclaimed Brightness (宣明; xuān míng)
 Lower Concubine of Congealed Brightness (凝暉; níng huī)
 Lower Concubine of Congealed Splendidness (凝華; níng huá)
 Lower Concubine of Conducive Splendidness (順華; shùn huá)
 Lower Concubine of Light Instruction (光訓; guāng xùn)
 27 Hereditary Consorts (世婦; shì fù)
 Lady of Talents (才人; cái rén)
 Selected Lady (採女; cǎi nǚ)

Northern Zhou
 1 Empress (皇后; Huánghòu)
3  Madames (夫人; fū rén), later 3 Consorts (妃; fēi)
 Noble Consort (貴妃; guì fēi)
 Great Noble Consort (長貴妃; zhǎng guì fēi)
 Virtuous Consort (德妃; dé fēi)
 3 (㚤; yì)
 6 Imperial Concubines (嬪; pín)
 Lady of Bright Splendidness (昭化; zhāo huà)
 Imperial Beauties (禦媛; yù yuàn)
 Lady of Upper Beauty (上媛; shàng yuàn)
 Lady of Middle Beauty (中媛; zhōng yuàn)
 Lady of Lower Beauty (下媛; xià yuàn)
 Lady of Imperial Gracefulness (禦婉; yù wǎn)
 Lady of Upper Gracefulness (上婉; shàng wǎn)
 Lady of Middle Gracefulness (中婉; zhōng wǎn)
 Lady of Lower Gracefulness (下婉; xià wǎn)

During the reign of Emperor Xuan, five Empresses were created (unprecedented by Chinese standards):
 Yang Lihua, First Great Empress of Heaven (天元大皇后 楊麗華)
 Zhu Manyue, Great Empress of Heaven (天大皇后 朱滿月)
 Chen Yueyi, Great Centre Empress of Heaven (天中大皇后 陳月儀)
 Yuchi Chifan, Great Left Empress of Heaven (天左大皇后 尉遲熾繁)
 Yuan Leshang, Great Right Empress of Heaven (天右大皇后 元樂尚)
In addition, there were an innumerable number of consorts in the harem.

Sui
In the beginning, there existed a simple system of rankings for imperial consorts:
 1 Empress (皇后; huáng hòu)
 4(?) Concubine (嬪; pín)
 9 Hereditary Consorts (世婦; shì fù)
 38 Ladies of His Majesty (禦女; yù nǚ)
There also existed a system of Women Palace Officials (女官; nǚ guān) to manage ceremonial affairs in the harem. The system was based on similar systems in the past.

After the death of Empress Dugu, Emperor Wen expanded the ranks of the consorts to the following:
 1 Empress (皇后; huáng hòu)
 3 Noble Ladies (貴人; guì rén)
 9 Imperial Concubines (嬪; pín)
 27 Hereditary Consorts (世婦; shì fù)
 81 Ladies of His Majesty (禦女; yù nǚ)

During the reign of Emperor Yang, the ranking system was expanded yet again, based on systems in the past, to the following:
 1 Empress (皇后; huáng hòu)
 3 Consorts (夫人; fū rén)
 Noble Consort (貴妃; guì fēi)
 Pure Consort (淑妃; shū fēi)
 Virtuous Consort (德妃; dé fēi)
 9 Imperial Concubines (嬪; pín)
 Lady of Conducive Wellness (順儀; shùn yí)
 Lady of Supportive Wellness (順容; shùn róng)
 Lady of Splendid Wellness (順華; shùn huá)
 Lady of Cultivated Deportment (修儀; xiū yí)
 Lady of Cultivated Countenance (修容; xiū róng)
 Lady of Cultivated Splendidness (修華; xiū huá)
 Lady of Complete Deportment (充衣; chōng yī)
 Lady of Complete Countenance (充容; chōng róng)
 Lady of Complete Splendidness (充華; chōng huá)
 12 Handsome Fairness (婕妤; jié yú)
 15 Hereditary Consorts(世婦; shì fù)
 Beauty (美人; měi rén)
 Talented Lady (才人; cái rén)
 24 Ladies of Treasure (寶林; bǎolín)
 24 Ladies of His Majesty (禦女; yù nǚ)
 37 Ladies of Elegance (採女; cǎi nǚ)

Tang
Imperial consorts of Tang China are organized in eight or nine ranks, in addition to the empress. They are also called the "inner officials" (內官), as opposed to "palace officials" (宮官), the bureaucracy.
 1 Empress (皇后; huáng hòu)
 4 Consort (夫人; fū rén)
 Noble Consort (貴妃; guì fēi)
 Pure Consort (淑妃; shū fēi)
 Virtuous Consort (德妃; dé fēi)
 Able Consort (賢妃; xián fēi)
 9 Imperial Concubine (嬪; pín)
 Lady of Bright Deportment (昭儀; zhāo yí)
 Lady of Bright Countenance (昭容; zhāo róng)
 Lady of Bright Beauty (昭媛; zhāo yuàn)
 Lady of Cultivated Deportment (修儀; xiū yí)
 Lady of Cultivated Countenance (修容; xiū róng)
 Lady of Cultivated Beauty (修媛; xiū yuàn)
 Lady of Complete Deportment (充儀; chōng yí)
 Lady of Complete Countenance (充容; chōng róng)
 Lady of Complete Beauty (充媛; chōng yuàn)
 9 Lady of Handsome Fairness (婕妤; jié yú)
 9 Beauty (美人; měi rén)
 9 Lady of Talents (才人; cái rén)
 27 Lady of Treasure / Lady of Precious Bevy (寶林; bǎo lín)
 27 Lady of His Majesty / Secondary Concubine (禦女; yù nǚ)
 27 Selected Lady / Lady of Elegance (採女; cǎi nǚ)

During the reign of Gaozong:
 1 Empress (皇后; huáng hòu)
 4 Consort (夫人; fū rén)
 Noble Consort (貴妃; guì fēi)
 Pure Consort (淑妃; shū fēi)
 Virtuous Consort (德妃; dé fēi)
 Able Consort (賢妃; xián fēi)
 9 Imperial Concubine (嬪; pín)
 Lady of Bright Deportment (昭儀; zhāo yí)
 Lady of Bright Countenance (昭容; zhāo róng)
 Lady of Bright Beauty (昭媛; zhāo yuàn)
 Lady of Cultivated Deportment (修儀; xiū yí)
 Lady of Cultivated Countenance (修容; xiū róng)
 Lady of Cultivated Beauty (修媛; xiū yuàn)
 Lady of Complete Deportment (充儀; chōng yí)
 Lady of Complete Countenance (充容; chōng róng)
 Lady of Complete Beauty (充媛; chōng yuàn)
 9 Lady of Handsome Fairness (婕妤; jié yú)
 9 Beauty (美人; měi rén)
 9 Lady of Talents (才人; cái rén)
In 662, the titles were temporarily changed to be devoid of feminine and superficial quality. This seemingly feminist change was reverted in the twelfth month of 670. The rationales were not explained in official records in both instances. However, some scholars have speculated it to be the suggestion of Empress Wu to her husband.

During the reign of Xuanzong:
 1 Empress (皇后; huáng hòu)
 1 Gracious Consort (惠妃; huì fēi), 1 Beautiful Consort (麗妃; lì fēi), 1 Splendid Consort (華妃; huá fēi)
 6 Ladies of Ceremony (儀; yí)
 Lady of Warm Ceremony (淑儀; shū yí)
 Lady of Moral Ceremony (德儀; dé yí)
 Lady of Virtuous Ceremony (賢儀; xián yí)
 Lady of Conducive Ceremony (順儀; shùn yí)
 Lady of Graceful Ceremony (婉儀; wǎn yí)
 Lady of Fragrant Ceremony (芳儀; fāng yí)
 4 Beauty (美人; měi rén)
 7 Talented Lady (才人; cái rén)

The principal wife of the Crown Prince is called Crown Princess (太子妃; tài zǐ fēi), which is held by only one person at any given time. There are 5 other ranks of consorts:
 2 Ladies of Excellence (良娣; liáng dì)
 6 Filial Ladies of Excellence (良嬡; liang ai)
 10 Ladies of Inherent Excellence (承徽; chéng huī)
 16 Ladies of Clear Instruction (昭訓; zhāo xùn)
 24 Ladies of Decorous Service (奉儀; fèng yí)

Five Dynasties and Ten Kingdoms
During these times, governments were replaced frequently, and as a result, it is difficult for modern scholars to derive any solid information on ranking systems during these times.

However, it is known that the Later Tang used the following system:
 Lady of Bright Countenance (昭容; zhāo róng)
 Lady of Bright Deportment (昭儀; zhāo yí)
 Lady of Bright Beauty (昭媛; zhāo yuàn)
 (出使; chū shǐ)
 (禦正; yù zhèng)
 True Servant (侍眞; shì zhēn)
 Lady of Honorable Talent (懿才; yì cái)
 (咸一; xián yī)
 Precious Flower (瑤芳; yáo fāng)
 Lady of Honorable Moral (懿德; yì dé)
 (宣一; xuān yī)
Whether there were any limits to the holders of these titles are unknown.

Song, Liao, Jin
Song
 1 Empress (皇后; huáng hòu)
 4 Consorts (妃; fēi)
 Noble Consort (貴妃; guì fēi)
 Pure Consort (淑妃; shū fēi)
 Virtuous Consort (德妃; dé fēi)
 Able Consort (賢妃; xián fēi)
 Imperial Consort (宸妃; chén fēi), created by Renzong
 Imperial Concubines (嬪; pín)
 Lady of Highest Ceremony (太儀; tài yí)
 Lady of Noble Ceremony (貴儀; guì yí)
 Lady of Imperial Ceremony (妃儀; fēi yí)
 Lady of Warm Ceremony (淑儀; shū yí)
 Lady of Graceful Ceremony (婉儀; wǎn yí)
 Lady of Conducive Ceremony (順儀; shùn yí)
 Lady of Conducive Appearance (順容; shùn róng)
 Lady of Warm Appearance (淑容; shū róng)
 Lady of Graceful Appearance (婉容; wǎn róng)
 Lady of Bright Deportment (昭儀; zhāo yí)
 Lady of Bright Countenance (昭容; zhāo róng)
 Lady of Bright Beauty (昭媛; zhāo yuàn)
 Lady of Cultivated Deportment (修儀; xiū yí)
 Lady of Cultivated Countenance (修容; xiū róng)
 Lady of Cultivated Beauty (修媛; xiū yuàn)
 Lady of Complete Deportment (充衣; chōng yī)
 Lady of Complete Countenance(充容; chōng róng)
 Lady of Complete Beauty (充媛; chōng yuàn)
 Handsome Fairness (婕妤; jié yú)
 Beauty (美人; měi rén)
 Talented Lady (才人; cái rén)
 Noble Lady (貴人; guì rén), created by Zhenzong

Liao
 1 Empress (皇后; huáng hòu)
 2 Ladies of Beautiful Ceremony (麗儀; lì yí)
 3 Ladies of Warm Ceremony (淑儀; shū yí)
 4 Ladies of Bright Ceremony (昭儀; zhāo yí)
 5  Ladies of Conducive Ceremony (順儀; shùn yí)
 6 Ladies of Fragrant Ceremony (芳儀; fāng yí)
 7  Ladies of Peaceful Ceremony (和儀; hé yí)

Jin
 1 Empress (皇后; huáng hòu)
 2 First Consorts (元妃; yuán fēi)
 4 Consorts (妃; fēi)
 Noble Consort (貴妃; guì fēi)
 Pure Consort (淑妃; shū fēi)
 Virtuous Consort (德妃; dé fēi)
 Able Consort (賢妃; xián fēi)
 9 Imperial Concubines (嬪; pín)
 Lady of Bright Deportment (昭儀; zhāo yí)
 Lady of Bright Countenance (昭容; zhāo róng)
 Lady of Bright Beauty (昭媛; zhāo yuàn)
 Lady of Cultivated Deportment (修儀; xiū yí)
 Lady of Cultivated Countenance (修容; xiū róng)
 Lady of Cultivated Beauty (修媛; xiū yuàn)
 Lady of Complete Deportment (充衣; chōng yī)
 Lady of Complete Countenance (充容; chōng róng)
 Lady of Complete Beauty (充媛; chōng yuàn)
 9 Lady of Handsome Fairness (婕妤; jié yú)
 9 Beauty (美人; měi rén)
 9 Talented Lady (才人; cái rén)
 27 Lady of Precious Bevy / Lady of Treasure (寶林; bǎo lín)
 27 Secondary Concubine / Lady of His Majesty (禦女; yù nǚ)
 27 Lady of Elegance / Selected Lady (採女; cǎi nǚ)

Yuan

The ranking system was at its simplest, and only consists of Empress, Consort, and Concubine. No limits were set on the number of people who could enjoy the title, but only one empress could exist.

Although the number of ranks were few, there existed a subsystem of ranking by prestige inside the Yuan harem. The tent (Chinese: 宮帳, translated term from Mongolian: 斡兒垜) that a consort lives in often determines their status. These tents often contain multiple Empresses, Consorts, and Concubines. In the many tents that existed, the first Empress of the first tent is considered to be the most prestigious consort.

As with all parts of the Mongol Empire, Goryeo provided palace women to the Yuan dynasty. Korean concubines were procured by the Khan. One of them was Empress Gi, who, through her political command and incorporation of Korean females and eunuchs in the court, spread Korean clothing, food, and lifestyle in the capital. Empress Gi intervened in Goryeo and her family contended with the Goryeo royal family; her family was purged by Gongmin of Goryeo, and Gi retaliated with a failed Yuan invasion of Korea in 1364. The entry of Korean women into the Yuan court was reciprocated by the entry of Yuan princesses into the Goryeo court, beginning with the marriage of Chungnyeol of Goryeo and a daughter of Kublai Khan; in total, 9 princesses of the Yuan imperial court married into the Goryeo royal family.

Imperial marriages between the imperial clan of the Yuan existed between certain states and tribes. These included the Onggirat tribe, Idug-qut's Uighur tribe, the Oirat tribe, and the Goryeo royal family.George Qingzhi Zhao. Marriage as Political Strategy and Cultural Expression: Mongolian Royal Marriages from World Empire to Yuan Dynasty.

The Emperor Gong of Song surrendered to the Yuan dynasty in 1276 and was married off to a Yuan princess of the imperial Borjigin family. Zhao Xian had one son with the Yuan princess, Zhao Wanpu. Zhao Xian's son Zhao Wanpu was kept alive by the Yuan court because of his mother's imperial Borjigin ancestry even after the Emperor Gong of Song was ordered to be killed by Gegeen Khan. Zhao Wanpu was only moved and exiled. The outbreak of the Song loyalist Red Turban Rebellion in Henan led to a recommendation that Zhao Wanpu should be transferred somewhere else by an Imperial Censor in 1352. The Yuan did not want the Chinese rebels to get their hands on Zhao Wanpu so no one was permitted to see him and Zhao Wanpu's family and himself were exiled to Shazhou near the border by the Yuan Emperor. Paul Pelliot and John Andrew Boyle commented on Rashid-al-Din Hamadani's chapter The Successors of Genghis Khan in his work Jami' al-tawarikh, identified references by Rashid al-Din to Zhao Xian in his book where he mentions a Chinese ruler who was an "emir" and son-in-law to the Qan (Khan) after being removed from his throne by the Mongols and he is also called "Monarch of Song", or Suju (宋主 Songzhu) in the book.

Ming

The system was simple with five commonly used titles:
 Empress (皇后; huáng hòu)
 Imperial Noble Consort (皇貴妃; huáng guì fēi)
 Noble Consort (貴妃; guì fēi)
 Consort (妃; fēi)
 Concubine (嬪; pín)

Other known titles including:
 Lady of Handsome Fairness (婕妤; jié yú)
 Lady of Bright Deportment (昭儀; zhāo yí)
 Lady of Bright Countenance (昭容; zhāo róng)
 Noble Lady (貴人; guì rén)
 Beauty (美人; měi rén)

For the Crown Prince:
 Crown Princess (太子妃; tài zǐ fēi)
 Talented Lady (才人; cái rén)
 Lady of Selected Service (選侍; xuǎn shì)
 Lady of Gentleness (淑女; shū nǚ)

Human tribute, including servants, eunuchs, and virgin girls came from: China's various ethnic tribes, Mongolia, Korea, Vietnam, Cambodia, Central Asia, Siam, Champa, and Okinawa.

Joseon sent a total of 114 women to the Ming dynasty, consisting of 16 virgin girls (accompanied by 48 female servants), 42 cooks (執饌女), and 8 musical performers (歌舞女). The women were sent to the Yongle and Xuande emperors in a total of 7 missions between 1408 and 1433. Xuande was the last Ming emperor to receive human tribute from Korea; with his death in 1435, 53 Korean women were repatriated. There was much speculation that the Yongle Emperor's real mother was a Korean or Mongolian concubine. Relations between Ming China and Joseon Korea improved dramatically and became much more amicable and mutually profitable during Yongle's reign. Yongle and Xuande were said to have a penchant for Korean cuisine and women.

Central Asian women were provided to the Zhengde Emperor by a Muslim guard and Sayyid Hussein from Hami. The guard was Yu Yung and the women were Uighur. It is unknown who really was behind the anti-pig slaughter edict. The speculation of him becoming a Muslim is remembered alongside his excessive and debauched behavior along with his concubines of foreign origin. Muslim Central Asian girls were favored by Zhengde like how Korean girls were favored by Xuande. A Uighur concubine was kept by Zhengde. Foreign origin Uighur and Mongol women were favored by the Zhengde emperor.

Qing

The system was one of the simplest systems in Chinese history. Officially, there were eight classes:
 Empress (皇后; huáng hòu)
 Imperial Noble Consort (皇貴妃; huáng guì fēi)
 Noble Consort (貴妃; guì fēi)
 Consort (妃; fēi)
 Concubine (嬪; pín)
 Noble Lady (貴人; guì rén)
 First Class Attendant (常在; cháng zài)
 Second Class Attendant (答應; dā yìng)

"Lady-in-waiting" (官女子; guān nǘ zǐ) was typically used to refer to all the women working in the palace of the inner court. It was not part of the official ranking.

The system was solid, but the number of consorts an emperor actually had during the Qing dynasty is subject to wild variations. The Kangxi Emperor (r. 1661–1722) holds the record for having the most consorts with 79, while the Guangxu Emperor (r. 1875–1908) holds the record for having the fewest consorts, with one empress and two imperial  concubines—a total of just three imperial consorts.

There were limits placed on how many imperial concubines could hold the ranks of 'Concubine', and above. An emperor could have 1 empress, 1 imperial noble consort, 2 noble consorts, 4 consorts and 6 concubines at a time. 

Women that attained the rank of 'Concubine' and above would be given a residence in the main section of a palace in the Forbidden City, and when being addressed by lower ranked consorts and servants, would have to be called 'Your Highness' (娘娘; níang níang). All people were expected to use deprecating self-titles when addressing higher ranks, and imperial consorts were no different.

The empress was the only legal wife of the emperor, while the other women were considered concubines. When a prince ascended to the throne, he was allowed to posthumously promote his late consorts into the ranks. A primary consort would be honored as empress, while secondary consorts and mistresses could be elevated to any of the seven other ranks (from second class attendant to imperial noble consort).

An emperor would be careful when promoting one of his imperial wives to the rank of 'Imperial Noble Consort' while the empress was still alive because this rank was considered a deputy empress (副后; fù hòu). As such, the promotions mostly happened when an imperial concubine (usually a noble consort) was hopelessly ill, or when the empress was unable to manage the harem (alone) and needed for someone to help her manage the affairs or she died and someone had to take the responsibilities of managing the inner court.

An empress who lived well into the reigns of two emperors would become the empress dowager (皇太后; huáng tài hòu). If her husband's son (but not her own) took the throne, she would be known as 'Mother Empress/Imperial Mother, Empress Dowager' (母后皇太后; mŭ hòu huáng tài hòu). In the cases when the emperor's birth mother was an imperial consort who never served as empress during her husband's reign, she would also become an empress dowager and would be known as 'Holy/Sage Mother, Empress Dowager' (聖母皇太后; shèng mŭ huáng tài hòu), as well as being posthumously honored as empress. An empress dowager who lived through the reigns of at least three subsequent emperors would be called 'Grand Empress Dowager' (太皇太后; tài huáng tài hòu).

The other imperial concubines of a former emperor would be addressed as 'Dowager' (太; tài) according to their rank. For example, a concubine would be called 'Dowager Concubine' (太嬪; tài pín), a noble consort would be called 'Dowager Noble Consort' (貴太妃; guì tài fēi) and an imperial noble consort would be called 'Dowager Imperial Noble Consort' (皇貴太妃; huáng guì tài fēi). The current empress and imperial concubines were expected to pay respect to the elders who held the position of 'Dowager Consort' (太妃; tài fēi) and above. However, some of the former emperor's concubines would simply be referred to as 'Palace woman of the Late Emperor' (先帝宮女; xiāndì gōngnü).

The tradition of ranking concubines ended when the Qing dynasty was overthrown, but the practice of giving rank to people who "unofficially" (lives with, but never marry) have more than one wife is still widespread. In addition, the term 'Madame' (夫人; fū rén) is still used, albeit rarely and only in very formal settings, as an honorific title towards another person's wife in China.

After the Second Manchu invasion of Korea, the Joseon Kingdom was forced to give several women as concubines to the Qing's Prince Regent Dorgon. In 1650, Dorgon married the Korean Princess Uisun, a distant relative of the king, who was adopted and given the title of 'Royal Princess' (公主; gōngzhŭ'') so she can be married off to Dorgon. The Joseon court revoked Princess Uisun's title and royal privileges after Dorgon died. It is said that Dorgon married two Korean princesses at Lianshan, however, there is no evidence of him marrying any other Joseon princess besides Princess Uisun in Joseon records and it is extremely unlikely as Dorgon died in December 1650, only few months after his marriage to Princess Uisun.

See also
 Harem

References

Citations

Sources 

 

Chinese imperial consorts
 
Chinese culture
Concubinage
Chinese concubines